Division 2 is the fourth level in the league system of Swedish women's football and comprises 9 sections with 10  football teams in each.

Current sections - 2019 season

Div 2 Norra Norrland
Alviks IK | Assi IF | Hägglunds IoFK | IFK Åkullsjön | Infjärdens SK | Köpmanholmen-Bjästa IF | Luleå DFC | Mariehem SK | Morön BK | Notvikens IK  

Div 2 Södra Norrland
Frösö IF | IF Team Hudik | Krokom/ Dvärsätt IF | Ljusdals IF | Myssjö-Ovikens IF | Remsle UIF FF | Selånger FK | Sund IF | Sundsvall FK | Östersunds DFF 

Div 2 Norra Svealand
IK Huge | KIF Örebro DUFF | Korsnäs IF FK | Stensätra IF | Strömsbro IF | Västanfors IF FK | Västerås BK 30 | Västerås IK | Örebro SK Söder  

Div 2 Östra Svealand
Bajen DFF | Bele Barkarby FF | Dalhem IF | Danmark-Sirius DFF | Gimo IF FK | IF Brommapojkarna | IFK Lidingö FK | IFK Täby FK | Roslagsbro IF | Tierps IF 

Div 2 Södra Svealand
Borens IK | Enskede IK | Haninge DFF | IFK Nyköping | Kisa BK | Smedby AIS | Stuvsta IF | Telge United FF | Triangelns IK | Tyresö DFF  

Div 2 Norra Götaland
IF Viken | IFK Skoghall DF | IK Arvika Fotboll | IK Gauthiod | IK Rössö Uddevalla | Mallbackens IF | Mariestads BoIS FF | Skövde KIK | Stångenäs AIS | Ämterviks FF 

Div 2 Östra Götaland
Asarums IF FK | Glimåkra IF | Habo IF | IFK Värnamo | Landsbro IF | Lindsdals IF | Lörby IF | Madesjö IF | Rödeby AIF | Älmhults IF  

Div 2 Västra Götaland
Derome BK | Husqvarna FF | IF Norvalla | IK Friscopojkarna | Jitex DFF | Mariebo IK | Qviding FIF | Skepplanda BTK | Torslanda IK | Vallens IF  

Div 2 Södra Götaland
Borgeby FK | Falkenbergs FF | Husie IF | Höllvikens GIF | IF Böljan | IF Limhamn Bunkeflo | IS Halmia | Ljungby IF | Stattena IF | Valinge IF

External links 
Swedish Football Association (Svenska Fotbollförbundet) - Kontaktuppgifter och tävlingar

References

4
Summer association football leagues
Professional sports leagues in Sweden